Eugenia Ostapciuc (born 19 October 1947) is a Moldovan politician who served as the 5th president of the Moldovan Parliament from 2001 to 2005. She is a member of the Party of Communists of the Republic of Moldova.

References

Party of Communists of the Republic of Moldova politicians
Presidents of the Moldovan Parliament
People from Drochia District
1947 births
Living people